Peter Kalden (died 1996) was a German World War II fighter ace, attached to JG 51. He was credited with 69 victories.

Summary of career

Aerial victory claims
According to US historian David T. Zabecki, Kalden was credited with 69 aerial victories. Mathews and Foreman, authors of Luftwaffe Aces — Biographies and Victory Claims, researched the German Federal Archives and found records for 69 aerial victory claims, all of which claimed on the Eastern Front.

Awards
 Knight's Cross of the Iron Cross on 6 December 1944 as Leutnant and Staffelführer of the 13./Jagdgeschwader 51 "Mölders"

Notes

References

Citations

Bibliography

 
 
 
 

1923 births
1996 deaths
Luftwaffe pilots
German World War II flying aces
Recipients of the Knight's Cross of the Iron Cross